Ambulyx matti is a species of moth of the  family Sphingidae. It is known from India.

References

Ambulyx
Moths described in 1923
Moths of Asia